Jacqueline Sagana (born April 8, 1984 in Barcelona, Spain) known as Jackie Sagana, is a Spanish R&B singer of Filipino descent.

Early life 
Jackie is the eldest sister of Maria Sagana and is married to singer / songwriter Austin who formed a group in 2006 as Jackstin.

Career 
In 2006 she met her husband Austin Music and decided to create the "Jackstin" music group, releasing their first album "Taste ya" from which they released the first single with the same name and that was the melody of the show "Fama: A bailar " in Spain.

Three years later, in 2009, Jackstin released his last single as a group "Sexy Boy" for Sony BMG Music to launch as a solo singer to the world of music.

In 2010 he published his first album "Rock it" and in 2011, along with radio host and DJ Dani Moreno recorded the song "Domino" which will be awarded the best national dance / pop project nomination with Enrique Iglesias, Ludacris or Juan Magan.

Discography

Albums

Singles

Awards 
 Awards "40 Principales"(Spain) to the best national dance / pop project for "Domino" with Dani Moreno in 2011.

References

External links 
 Official Twitter

Living people
1984 births
People from Barcelona
Spanish people of Filipino descent
21st-century Spanish singers
21st-century Spanish women singers